Meteliai Regional Park (Metelių regioninis parkas), established in 1992, is a natural and cultural reserve in southern Lithuania.

The park covers about 177 square kilometers, including three lakes: Lake Metelys, Lake Dusia, and Lake Obelija. Its geographic features include glacial moraines.

130 bird species breed in the park; it is visited by over 10,000 individuals during migratory seasons. Flocks of up to 2,000 crested grebes, 15,000 coots, and 4,000 tufted ducks have been observed.

The park incorporates a number of villages along with battle sites, churches, cemeteries, and Stone Age settlements.

Gallery

References

Regional parks of Lithuania
Tourist attractions in Alytus County